James Sik Hung Ling, D.Min, B.D (25 September 1951 – 15 November 2001) was a leader in the Christian community of Hong Kong.
He was an Officer of the Salvation Army and pastored multiple congregations; before serving as the General Secretary of the Salvation Army Hong Kong and Macau Command until his death in 2001.

Personal life

James was born on September 25, 1951 in Hong Kong; he was the son of a headmaster who brought his family to Hong Kong after the Chinese Civil War. James attended Chung Chi College of The Chinese University of Hong Kong and received his Bachelor of Divinity in 1981; he obtained his Doctor of Ministry from the Reformed Theological Seminary in 1996.

He met his wife, Fona, while they were volunteering at a Christian crusade. They both entered ministry and had a son named Samuel, who also became an alumnus of Chung Chi College.

Ministry
James' father was a devout Christian, and his family spent a large portion of his childhood at the local Salvation Army corps. He accepted Christ at a young age and was an active Salvationist; he was an enthusiastic Youth leader and a bandsman in the Salvation Army brass band.

He accepted God's calling in the 1970s and entered the Salvation Army's Training College. After graduation, he was ordained to serve in multiple Corps; including founding the William Booth Corps in 1983.

In 1987, he was commissioned to Australia to pastor the Sydney Chinese Corps where there was a growing Hong Kong migrant population; he was appointed as a JP during this tenure for his humanitarian efforts.

James came back to Hong Kong in the 1990s, and served multiple appointments including: the Field Secretary coordinating the Christian ministries in HK and Macau, the Social Services Secretary overseeing >80 social service units and centers, and subsequently the General Secretary.

In his early career; James had a special interest in Christian apologetics especially in the defence against Christian cults in HK. In his later career; he became more involved in education and lectured in the Theology department of the Chinese University of Hong Kong, Bible Seminary of Hong Kong, Alliance Bible Seminary, China Graduate School of Theology.

Death
James' life came to an early end when he was Promoted to Glory on 15 November 2001 after a year-long battle with recurrent nasopharyngeal carcinoma.

As a remembrance; the Kiwanis club dedicated a 'Major James Ling Memorial Community Service Award - 香港國際同濟會紀念凌錫洪少校社區服務獎' to secondary school students whom have distinguished themselves in community service.

References

1951 births
2001 deaths
Alumni of the Chinese University of Hong Kong
Hong Kong Salvationists
Salvation Army officers
Reformed Theological Seminary alumni